Rachel Rye Keller (born December 25, 1992) is an American actress, best known for her roles as Sydney "Syd" Barrett in the FX television series Legion and as Simone Gerhardt in the second season of the FX black comedy crime drama anthology series Fargo.

Early life 
Keller was born in Los Angeles, and grew up in Saint Paul, Minnesota. She attended the Saint Paul Conservatory for Performing Artists and graduated in 2014 from Carnegie Mellon University. Keller's father is Jewish, and she also celebrates Hanukkah.

Career 
Keller began her career with roles in various short films and guest starring roles in the television series The Mentalist and  Supernatural.

Keller received wide recognition for her recurring role as Simone Gerhardt in the second season of the FX anthology television series Fargo.

Between 2017 and 2019, she starred as Sydney "Syd" Barrett, the female lead in the FX series Legion.

In 2019, Keller starred as Cassandra Pressman in the Netflix mystery drama series The Society. In 2022, she had a leading role in the HBO Max series Tokyo Vice, replacing Odessa Young.

Filmography

Film

Television

References

External links 
 

1992 births
Actresses from Minnesota
American television actresses
Jewish American actresses
21st-century American actresses
Living people
Actresses from Los Angeles
Actresses from Saint Paul, Minnesota
Carnegie Mellon University alumni